The Zoom Phloom is a log flume designed by Hopkins Rides at Morey's Piers in New Jersey. It goes up to 60 feet in the Wildwood Boardwalk. Zoom Phloom has two drops. One drop leading riders under the Wildwood boardwalk.

History
The Zoom Phloom was built in 1985 to compete with the Hunt's Pier's Log Flume. The popular log flume at Hunt's Pier convinced the Morey Brothers to build a Log Flume which they named Zoom Phloom. The ride first appeared when the Jumbo Jet (Morey's Piers) was in its final years. The Zoom Phloom also had the Jet Star (Morey's Piers) behind it. When Morey's Piers wanted a new rollercoaster they had  to find a rollercoaster that was very close to the other rides. The Zoom Phloom passes very close to The Great Nor'easter.

Theme
The theme of the Zoom Phloom is a tropical themed ride. It has artificial Palm Trees, rocks, and waterfall. Under the boardwalk the ride plays the song "Under the Boardwalk" and has people sitting on the beach and a Sea Dragon smiling.

References

Amusement rides introduced in 1985
Morey's Piers